Ackley Lake State Park is a public recreation area located four miles southwest of Hobson, Montana. The state park covers  centered around  Ackley Lake. The Little Belt Mountains and Snowy Mountains are visible on the horizon. The park is operated by the Montana Department of Fish, Wildlife and Parks on land leased from the Montana Department of Natural Resources and Conservation.

History
The Ackley Lake was originally a 40-acre natural pond owned by Jean Acley. It became a reservoir in 1938 with the completion of an earthen embankment dam measuring 51 feet high and 3,514 feet long. The reservoir is an off-stream storage project with a supply canal from the Judith River. The site became Ackley State Park in 1940. It was threatened with the loss of its status as a state park after the Montana State Parks and Recreation Board adopted a five-year strategic plan, "Charting a New Tomorrow," that proposed a rebranding of the parks in its system. In 2017, the parks department renewed its lease with the Department of Natural Resources and Conservation for a further five years to the end 2021.

Activities and amenities
The park offers stocked trout fishing, boating with two boat ramps, picnicking facilities, and a 26-site campground.

References

External links
Ackley Lake State Park Montana Fish, Wildlife & Parks

State parks of Montana
Protected areas of Judith Basin County, Montana
Protected areas established in 1940